The U.S. state of South Carolina first required its residents to register their motor vehicles and display license plates in 1917. , plates are issued by the South Carolina Department of Motor Vehicles. Only rear plates have been required since 1975.

Passenger baseplates

1917 to 1975
The 1955 (dated 1956) issue was the first South Carolina license plate that complied with these standards.

1976 to present

Optional plates

Non-passenger plates

Special plates

References

External links
South Carolina license plates, 1969–present
License Plates of South Carolina

South Carolina
Transportation in South Carolina
1917 introductions
1917 in transport
South Carolina transportation-related lists